The Set-Up is a 1949 American film noir boxing drama directed by Robert Wise and starring Robert Ryan and Audrey Totter.  The screenplay was adapted by Art Cohn from a 1928 narrative poem of the same name by Joseph Moncure March. The Set-Up was the last film Wise made for RKO, and he named it his favorite of the pictures he directed for the studio, as well as one of his top ten of his career.

Plot
Bill "Stoker" Thompson, a 35-year-old has-been boxer, is about to take on an opponent at the Paradise City Arena. His wife, Julie, fears that this fight may be his last and wants him to forfeit the match. Tiny, Stoker's manager, is sure he will continue to lose fights, so he takes money for a "dive" from a mobster. He is so certain of Stoker's failure that he does not inform the boxer of the set-up.

Stoker and Julie passionately debate whether he should participate in the fight. Julie tells him that she has a headache and won't attend. Stoker says the $500 prize could allow them to buy a cigar stand or invest in another boxer, Tony Martinez, and start a new life. Julie says she cares more about his well-being than money, but Stoker responds: "If you're a fighter, you gotta fight."

After Stoker departs for the arena, Julie continues to struggle with her fear and desire to support him. Ultimately she doesn't use her ticket to the event, and instead roams the streets surrounding the arena.

At the beginning of the fourth round of what is a vicious match with the much younger and heavily favored Tiger Nelson, Stoker learns about the fix. Even though he is told that Little Boy, a feared gangster, is behind the set-up, he refuses to give up the fight.

Stoker wins the vocal support of blood-thirsty fans who had at first rooted against him. He eventually defeats Nelson. Stoker pays for his decision with a beating in an alley outside the arena. The group irreparably damages Stoker's hand by smashing it with a brick.

Stoker staggers out of the alley and collapses into Julie's arms. "I won tonight," he tells her. "Yes," she answers. "You won tonight. We both won tonight."

Cast
 Robert Ryan as Bill "Stoker" Thompson
 Audrey Totter as Julie Thompson
 George Tobias as Tiny
 Alan Baxter as Little Boy
 Wallace Ford as Gus
 Percy Helton as Red
 Hal Fieberling as "Tiger" Nelson
 Darryl Hickman as Shanley
 Kenny O'Morrison as Moore
 James Edwards as Luther Hawkins
 David Clarke as "Gunboat" Johnson
 Phillip Pine as Tony Souza
 Arthur 'Weegee' Fellig (New York photographer) has a cameo as the timekeeper

Background
In 1947, almost two decades after March's poem was published, RKO paid him a little over $1,000 for the rights to the piece.  Although March had nearly a decade of Hollywood writing credits during the 1930s (working on what a 2008 essay in The Hudson Review called "one forgotten and now unseeable film after another"), RKO did not ask him to adapt his own poem.

The screen adaptation included a number of alterations to the original text. The protagonist's name was changed from Pansy Jones to Stoker Thompson, his race was changed from black to white, he went from being a bigamist to being devotedly married, and his beating and subsequent death on a subway track was turned into an alley assault and a shattered hand. The opponent's name was changed from Sailor Gray to Tiger Nelson.

Production

Casting 
In an audio commentary accompanying the 2004 DVD release of the film, Robert Wise attributes the change in the protagonist's race to the fact that RKO had no African-American star actors under contract. Although the film did have an African American actor (James Edwards) in a minor role as another boxer, Edwards was not a "star" under the then existing studio rules. March later commented in an Ebony interview, saying:
not only [did they throw] away the mainspring of the story, they evaded the whole basic issue of discrimination against the Negro.... Hollywood’s attitude to the Negro in films has been dictated all too often by box-office considerations: they are afraid of losing money in the Jim Crow South.

Robert Ryan, who was cast as Stoker Thompson, had boxing experience from his time at Dartmouth College, where he was heavyweight champion for four years in a row.

Wise and Sid Rogell had first thought of Joan Blondell to play Julie, following her performance as Zeena Krumbein in Nightmare Alley, but RKO owner Howard Hughes refused, saying "Blondell looks like she was shot out of the wrong end of a cannon now".

Filming 
Dore Schary, the uncredited executive producer who got the project going at RKO before his 1948 move to MGM, is credited with giving the film a real time narrative structure, three years before the device was used in High Noon. Viewers are shown the passage of time throughout the film:
 9:05 pm: The opening sequence features a clock in the town's square.
 9:11 pm: An alarm clock wakes Stoker.
 9:17 pm: Stoker leaves for the fight.
 9:35 pm: Julie paces with indecision, takes her ticket to the event, and leaves their room. Stoker sees the lights go off from across the street and believes she will be at the match.
 10:10 pm: Having returned to the room, Julie warms soup on the stove while Stoker is beaten in an alley across the street.
 10:16 pm: The long shot of the clock and the town square returns for the closing sequence.

Before The Set-Up, Richard Goldstone's production credits had been limited to a half-dozen Our Gang comedy shorts.

The fight scene, which features an exchange of blows between Stoker and his opponent that is very close to the original poem, was choreographed by former professional boxer Johnny Indrisano. Wise used three cameras to capture the action: one focused on the ring in its entirety; one on the fighters; and a third, hand-held device to catch details such as a glove connecting with a body.

Reception

Critical response
When the film was released, The New York Times reviewed the drama and lauded the picture's screenplay and the realistic depiction of the boxing milieu:
This RKO production...is a sizzling melodrama. The men who made it have nothing good to say about the sordid phase of the business under examination and their roving, revealing camera paints an even blacker picture of the type of fight fan who revels in sheer brutality. The sweaty, stale-smoke atmosphere of an ill-ventilated smalltime arena and the ringside types who work themselves into a savage frenzy have been put on the screen in harsh, realistic terms. And the great expectations and shattered hopes which are the drama of the dressing room also have been brought to vivid, throbbing life in the shrewd direction of Robert Wise and the understanding, colloquial dialogue written into the script by Art Cohn.

Jefferson Hunter, in a Summer 2008 essay for The Hudson Review, wrote:
All through The Set-Up, we see confirmed the oldest of truisms about film, that it tells its stories best in images, in what can be shown—a crowd’s blood lust, the boxers’ awareness of what’s coming to them in the end—as opposed to what is spoken or narrated.

Box office
The film opened in 13 key markets and grossed $245,000 for the week, being the number one film in the United States and remained there for another week.

Awards
Wins
 1949 Cannes Film Festival: Best Cinematography, Milton R. Krasner; FIPRESCI Prize, Robert Wise; 1949.

Nominated
 British Academy of Film and Television Arts: BAFTA Film Award, Best Film from any Source, United States; 1950.

References

External links

 
 
 
 
 
 

1949 films
1949 drama films
1940s sports drama films
American black-and-white films
American boxing films
American sports drama films
1940s English-language films
Film noir
Films based on poems
Films directed by Robert Wise
RKO Pictures films
1940s American films